AeroVironment, Inc. is an American defense contractor headquartered in Arlington, Virginia, that designs and manufactures unmanned aerial vehicles (UAVs). Paul B. MacCready Jr., a designer of human-powered aircraft, founded the company in 1971. The company is best known for its lightweight human-powered and solar-powered vehicles. The company is the US military's top supplier of small drones — notably the Raven, Switchblade, Wasp and Puma models.

Vehicles

Among the vehicles the company built are:
 Gossamer Condor – The first successful human-powered airplane. The Gossamer Condor is on display at the US National Air and Space Museum (NASM), since it won the first Kremer Prize in 1977.
Another of these planes is displayed at the National Air and Space Museum.
 Gossamer Penguin – A solar-powered variant of the Gossamer Albatross.
 Solar Challenger – This plane flew  from Paris, France, to England on solar power.
 High Altitude Solar (HALSOL)-This solar-powered unmanned aircraft was sponsored by the CIA in the 1980s as the first unmanned solar-powered aircraft prototyped for national security missions. It was declassified and transferred to the Ballistic Missile Defense Organization (BMDO) in 1993 where it was modified as a high altitude, long endurance (HALE) UAV technology demonstrator capable of becoming weaponized to destroy boost-phase theater ballistic missiles (Boost Phase Intercept).The goal was to develop the world's first "fly forever" HALE UAV that could be configured for national security missions. The program was cancelled in 1995 due to budget reductions in the Clinton Administration at which time the aircraft, called Pathfinder, was transferred to NASA. Pathfinder flew flight test missions at NASAs Dryden Flight Research Center before the transfer.
 NASA Pathfinder and Pathfinder Plus – This unmanned plane, built by AeroVironment as a part of the NASA Environmental Research Aircraft and Sensor Technology (ERAST) Program, demonstrated that an airplane could stay aloft for extended periods fueled by solar power. After initial successes, the Pathfinder was rebuilt into the larger Pathfinder Plus, which is on display at NASM. 
 NASA Centurion – The Centurion was an expansion of the Pathfinder concept, designed to achieve the ERAST Program goal of sustained flight at  altitude.
It was intended to be the prototype for the production Helios aircraft, envisioned as an "atmospheric satellite". The ERAST program was terminated in 2003, and as of 2008 Helios has not entered production. In actuality, it has been reborn in the form of the Global Observer UAS, currently in development under a Joint Concept Technology Demonstration led by United States Special Operations Command (USSOCOM]). The key technology shift was switching from solar power to liquid hydrogen power.
 Global Observer – The Los Angeles Times reported first flight of Global Observer in the Mojave Desert in January, 2011. The aircraft was powered by hydrogen.
 Sunraycer – This solar-powered car won the first world's first solar car race in Australia in 1987. The next fastest car finished two days later. This car is at the Smithsonian National Museum of American History.
 GM Impact – This was an electric car, developed as a prototype for a mass-production consumer car.
 RQ-11 Raven – a small military UAV. Over 9,000 Ravens had been delivered or were on order as of June 2008.
In 2007, the Wasp was selected by the US Air Force as the choice for their BATMAV Program. As of 2008, over 1,000 Wasp aircraft had been delivered.
Puma's avionics enable autonomous flight via GPS navigation. It was designed to demonstrate advanced propulsion technologies. It flew in June 2007 for five hours, powered by an onboard "fuel cell battery hybrid energy storage system". A flight in November 2007 lasted more than seven hours. On July 2, 2008, USSOCOM selected the Puma AE variant as its All Environment Capable Variant (AECV) solution.
It could climb and descend vertically, fly sideways, forward and backward, as well as rotate clockwise and counter-clockwise by remote control for about eight minutes.
 SkyTote – a vertical take-off and landing (VTOL)-fixed wing hybrid UAV, which offered VTOL takeoff capability and decreased energy usage.
 Switchblade – A miniature, electrically powered, armed unmanned drone kamikaze weapon, for field use. Now deployed in two configurations, the 300 for attacking personnel and the 600 for attacking armor.
 FQM-151 Pointer
 RQ-14 Dragon Eye
 Puma LE (Long Endurance)
 VAPOR Helicopter
 Snipe – a quadrotor design small enough to be deployed by an individual to collect surveillance. It is low light-capable and includes long-wave infrared sensors to take photos or video in day or night conditions. In May 2017, the first 20 Snipes were delivered to an undisclosed U.S. military customer.

Programs
As of 2007 AeroVironment held a five-year, $4.7 million IDIQ (indefinite-delivery, indefinite-quantity) contract from the U.S. Air Force Research Laboratory to develop UAV propulsion technologies. The contract also provided for specific tasks such as integration of solar cells into aircraft wings, electric motor efficiency improvement, and hydrogen storage systems.

HAPSMobile

HAPSMobile is a subsidiary of SoftBank planning to operate High Altitude Platform Station (HAPS) networks, with AeroVironment as a minority owner. HAPSMobile develops the Hawk30 solar-powered unmanned aircraft for stratospheric telecommunications, and has a strategic relationship with Loon LLC, a subsidiary of Google's parent Alphabet Inc.

Subsidiaries

AeroVironment owns Skytower, Inc., which was formed in 2000 to develop the technologies and government approvals to use high altitude UAVs as "atmospheric satellites", or high altitude communications relay platforms.

In July 2002 the NASA/AeroVironment UAV Pathfinder Plus carried commercial communications relay equipment developed by Skytower to test using the aircraft as an "atmospheric satellite". Because of the aircraft's high angle, the transmission utilized only one watt of power, or 1/10,000 that required by a terrestrial tower to provide the same signal. According to SkyTower's Stuart Hindle, "SkyTower platforms are basically geostationary satellites without the time delay." Hindle said that such platforms flying in the stratosphere, as opposed to actual satellites, can achieve much higher levels of frequency use. "A single SkyTower platform can provide over 1,000 times the fixed broadband local access capacity of a geostationary satellite using the same frequency band, on a bytes per second per square mile basis."

In January 2021, the company acquired Arcturus UAV, the manufacturer of the Arcturus T-20 UAV for US$405m.

References

External links

 
 

Aircraft manufacturers of the United States
Defense companies of the United States
Electric vehicle manufacturers of the United States
Companies listed on the Nasdaq
1971 establishments in the United States
1971 establishments in California
Technology companies established in 1971
Companies based in Arlington County, Virginia